The Australian soccer champions are the winners of the highest league in Australian men's soccer, which since 2005–06 is currently the A-League Men.

The National Soccer League was established in 1977. At the end of the 1977 season, Sydney City (now Hakoah Sydney City East) were the first club to be crowned champions.

As is the case in most Australian sports, the winners of a post-season playoffs competition, known as the Finals, has traditionally been crowned champion, unlike the first-past-the-post system used in many other countries. The team that finished first-past-the-post was often referred to as the Minor Premiers while the Finals winning team was awarded the Premiership. In an attempt to create more prestige around the first-past-the-post title, it was renamed the Premiership and the finals winning team is now awarded the Championship.

Background
In 1977, the Australian Soccer Association established the National Soccer League (NSL) of Australia, which included teams from Adelaide, Brisbane, Canberra, Melbourne and Sydney. The competition ran a promotion-relegation system for its entire lifespan as well as a knockout cup competition.

For the first seven seasons, the NSL awarded the championship to the team that finished first-past-the-post and was dominated by Sydney-based teams. By the mid-80s, the league had introduced a post-season playoffs competition that would crown the champions and the title was shared more evenly around the nation. Seasons initially ran over the winter months until 1989 when it was changed to the summer months to avoid conflicts with Australian rules football and the two rugby codes. By 2000, each major capital city had secured at least one NSL title outside of Perth. The Perth Glory made history in 2002–03 when they were crowned champions and the victory meant the five major cities of Adelaide, Brisbane, Melbourne, Perth and Sydney had all secured at least one NSL title over the duration of the league's history.

The National Soccer League was disbanded in 2004 and an 8-team A-League Men competition was established in 2005, which included a salary cap and no promotion-relegation. Adelaide, Newcastle and Perth were the only NSL teams retained in the new competition. It included one team from each of the major capital cities, two regional teams and a team from New Zealand. As is the case in many sporting leagues in Australia, a New Zealand-based team has been allowed entry into the top tiered Australian league since 1999. The decision to retain a New Zealand-based team in the top league has proved problematic in recent years due to Football Federation Australia's decision to move from the Oceania Football Confederation to the Asian Football Confederation in 2006. As a result, a New Zealand-based team can be crowned Premiers and/or Champions of Australia but is ineligible to compete in the Asian Champions League.

Lists of champions

National Soccer League (1977–2004)

A-League Men (2005–present)

Total Premierships won
Teams in bold will compete in the A-League as of the 2022–23 season.

National Cup winners

Australia Cup

NSL Cup

FFA Cup / Australia Cup

Total Cups won

Continental Champions

Oceania Club Championship

OFC Cup Winners' Cup

AFC Champions League

Multiple trophy wins

The Double

The Treble

Note: In the 2008–09 season Melbourne Victory won all three pieces of A-League silverware on offer, the Pre-Season Challenge Cup, the Premiership, and the Championship.

Pre-Season Cup winners

A-League Pre-Season Challenge Cup

Note: All seasons were exclusive to A-League clubs only.

Multiple title winners
Clubs in bold play in the A-League.

Total titles won
There are 21 clubs who have won an Australian title (either by winning the grand final or finishing top of the league in the seasons without a grand final), including eight who have won the A-League Men (2005–present). The most recent teams to join the list were Western United (2021–22 champions), Melbourne City (2020–21) and Adelaide United (2015–16).

Six teams have finished as runners up without ever winning the title: Heidelberg United (1979, 1980), Preston Lions (1987), Sydney United 58 (1988, 1996–97, 1998–99), Carlton (1997–98), Parramatta Power (2003–04) and Western Sydney Wanderers (2012–13, 2013–14, 2015–16).

Teams in bold compete in the A-League Men as of the 2022–23 season.

By city

Australian soccer champions map

See also

 List of association football competitions
 List of NSL Cup Finals
 List of A-League Men honours

Notes

References

A-League Men lists
Australia
soccer